Frank Soskice, Baron Stow Hill,  (23 July 1902 – 1 January 1979) was a British lawyer and Labour Party politician.

Background and education 

Soskice's father,  was from a family of Russian Jewish merchants. David Soskice became involved in the Russian Revolution as part of the Socialist Revolutionary Party and was the personal secretary to Alexander Kerensky. He had briefly edited the Society of Friends of Russian Freedom's newspaper Free Russia, briefly replacing Feliks Volkhovsky (the publication had financial support from the likes of Jacob Schiff and other anti-Tsarist elements). 

Caught in the Winter Palace during the October Revolution, Soskice fled to Britain as the Kerensykites were ousted and the Bolsheviks came to power. He became a British citizen in 1924. He was married to Frank Soskice's mother Juliet Catherine Emma Hueffer, who was the daughter of Catherine Madox Brown and Francis Hueffer, and so granddaughter of artist Ford Madox Brown, niece of Lucy Madox Brown (her mother's older half-sister) and her husband William Michael Rossetti, sister of Ford Madox Ford and Oliver Madox Hueffer and cousin of Olivia Rossetti Agresti.

Soskice was educated at the Froebel Demonstration School, St Paul's School, London, and Balliol College, Oxford. He studied law and was called to the bar at the Inner Temple in 1926. He served in the British Army with the Oxfordshire and Buckinghamshire Light Infantry during World War II. 

He served first in east Africa and then, as political welfare executive, in Cairo. Later he worked with the Special Operations Executive in London.

His son, David Soskice, is an economist.

Political career
Following the war, he was elected to parliament as a Labour Member of Parliament (MP) for Birkenhead East in the 1945 general election, and became Solicitor General, receiving the customary knighthood, in the government of Clement Attlee, serving in that office throughout Attlee's government. He was also, briefly, UK delegate to the United Nations General Assembly. As Solicitor General, Soskice was viewed as an important advocate for the government in the House of Commons. His constituency was abolished in the 1950 election, when he unsuccessfully fought Bebington, but he was soon returned to the House of Commons at a by-election in the Sheffield Neepsend constituency, where the sitting MP Harry Morris stood down to make way for Soskice. In April 1951, he became Attorney General.

In 1952, Soskice joined the shadow cabinet, and his fortunes rose in 1955 with the election of his close ally Hugh Gaitskell as party leader, although he continued his legal practice as well. His Sheffield Neepsend constituency was abolished for the 1955 general election, but in 1956 he won a by-election in the Newport seat in Monmouthshire that he would hold until he retired.

When Labour returned to government in 1964 under Harold Wilson, Soskice became Home Secretary. In this office he did not impress Wilson – he was in poor health, and he botched the response to an electoral boundary change dispute in Northamptonshire and accepted weakening amendments to the Race Relations Act of 1965.

In December 1965, Soskice was relieved of his Home Office responsibilities and made Lord Privy Seal. He had, though, ensured Government support for Sydney Silverman's Private Members Bill, passed on 28 October 1965, which suspended the death penalty in the United Kingdom for five years (except for treason). This reform is sometimes erroneously included with the Jenkins reforms which followed. In fact when the death penalty for murder was finally abolished in 1969, James Callaghan was Home Secretary.

In 1966, Soskice retired, and was created a life peer as Baron Stow Hill, of Newport in the County of Monmouth on 7 June 1966. Stow Hill is a steep hill in Newport, which runs from the city centre up to St. Woolos Cathedral.

Arms

References

External links 
 
Parliamentary Archives, Stow Hill Papers

1902 births
1979 deaths
20th-century British lawyers
Alumni of Balliol College, Oxford
Attorneys General for England and Wales
British Army personnel of World War II
British Secretaries of State
British barristers
British people of Russian descent
Knights Bachelor
Labour Party (UK) MPs for English constituencies
Stow Hill
Lords Privy Seal
Members of the Inner Temple
Members of the Privy Council of the United Kingdom
Ministers in the Attlee governments, 1945–1951
Ministers in the Wilson governments, 1964–1970
Oxfordshire and Buckinghamshire Light Infantry officers
People educated at St Paul's School, London
Politics of Newport, Wales
Secretaries of State for the Home Department
Solicitors General for England and Wales
UK MPs 1945–1950
UK MPs 1950–1951
UK MPs 1951–1955
UK MPs 1955–1959
UK MPs 1959–1964
UK MPs 1964–1966
UK MPs who were granted peerages
Life peers created by Elizabeth II
Welsh Labour Party MPs